Birmingham is the surviving remnant of a lunar impact crater.  It is named after the astronomer John Birmingham (not, as is often stated, the British city nor its Alabama namesake). 
The crater is located near the northern limb of the Moon, and so is viewed from the Earth at a low angle.

All that survives of the original formation is an irregular perimeter of low, indented ridges surrounding the lava-resurfaced interior. The inner floor is marked by several tiny craterlets, and the surface is unusually rough for a walled plain. The low angle of illumination allows fine details of this boulder-strewn field to be seen more clearly.

Location
The Birmingham formation lies just to the north of the Mare Frigoris, and to the east of the walled plain W. Bond. To the northeast is the smaller crater Epigenes, with Fontenelle to the west.

Satellite craters
By convention these features are identified on lunar maps by placing the letter on the side of the crater midpoint that is closest to Birmingham.

References

 
 
 
 
 
 
 
 
 
 
 
 

Impact craters on the Moon